Megas Alexandros Football Club was a Greek football club, based in Irakleia, Serres Prefecture.

Defunct football clubs in Greece
Football clubs in Central Macedonia
Association football clubs established in 1928
1928 establishments in Greece